Karel Urbánek (born 14 April 1972; died 11 May 2007) was a Czech football player.

Career

In 1999, Urbanek signed for Russian club FC Lokomotiv Nizhny Novgorod but did not like the conditions there.

Style of play

According to former Hradec Kralove coach Petr Pálka, Urbanek was two-footed and good at heading.

Honours
Hradec Králové
Czech Cup winner: 1994/95

References

1972 births
2007 deaths
Czechoslovak footballers
FC Hradec Králové players
Czech footballers
FK Drnovice players
FC Fastav Zlín players
FC Lokomotiv Nizhny Novgorod players
Czech expatriate footballers
Expatriate footballers in Russia
Russian Premier League players
FK Jablonec players
FC VSS Košice players
Expatriate footballers in Slovakia
FK Varnsdorf players
Czech expatriate sportspeople in Russia
Czech expatriate sportspeople in Slovakia

Association football defenders